"From My Garden" is the 38th single by Japanese singer Yōko Oginome. Written by Junko Kudō and Monday Michiru, the single was released on November 21, 1997, by Victor Entertainment.

Track listing
All music is composed and arranged by Monday Michiru.

References

External links

1997 singles
Yōko Oginome songs
Japanese-language songs
Victor Entertainment singles